Mahmudabad Rural District may refer to:
 Mahmudabad Rural District (Parsabad County), Ardabil province
 Mahmudabad Rural District (Isfahan Province)
 Mahmudabad Rural District (Shahin Dezh County), West Azerbaijan province